The Santander Bank Tower is a proposed skyscraper to be built in the U.S. city of Miami, Florida.

The complex consists of an 11 story parking garage square structure and an oval design building rising from within the square structure up to the 52nd floor (roof). It would accommodate the Santander Private Banking International offices as well as a proposed Santander Bank (Grupo Santander) Branch for walk in customers. This branch would be located at the North side of the building with direct access from the street and from the Building Lobby as well. The rest of the building would be leased for office/business space.

The tower would replace the existing 15-story Santander Private Banking tower built in the 70's. Construction is estimated to start in 2013-2014 and last no more than 3 years.

If approved, constructed, and completed, the tower would surpass the Four Seasons Hotel Miami and become the city's tallest building, unless or until the One Bayfront Plaza tower and the Empire World Towers are built.

Height

The Santander Bank Tower is on the proposed stage and in the process of applying for permits for development as of 2010. Originally designed as an 84-story Tower, the latest proposals reveal a 52-story Tower for their final project.

In May 2010, the height of the tower was cleared as "No Hazard to Air Navigation" by the  Federal Aviation Administration for the total height of 950 feet (280 m) above ground level (AGL) and 955 feet (291 m) above mean sea level (AMSL). This height includes temporary construction equipment which can stand over the proposed height of the tower (840 feet).

See also 
List of tallest buildings in Miami

External links 
Entry on Business Journal
Entry on South Florida Business Journal

Proposed skyscrapers in the United States
Skyscrapers in Miami